{{Infobox rail line
|name=Dortmund–Soest railway
|native_name =Bahnstrecke Dortmund–Soest
|native_name_lang = de
|routenumber = 431
| linenumber = 2103
| linelength_km= 54
|gauge = 
| electrification = 15 kV/16.7 Hz AC overhead catenary
|speed =  (max)
|tracks = 2
| image= Eisenbahn Dortmund Soest01.png
| image_width = 250px
|locale=North Rhine-Westphalia
|map_state=
|map=
{{Routemap|inline=1 |footnote=Source: German railway atlas

* formerly Dortmund Westfalenhalle|map=
STR~~ ~~ ~~Main line from Hamm
ABZg+r~~ ~~ ~~Line from Lünen
S+BHF~~164.4~~Dortmund Hbf
ABZgr~~ ~~ ~~Line to Wanne-Eickel
ABZgr~~ ~~ ~~Main line to Bochum/Witten
eTSHSTu~~{{BSsplit|Dortmund West (planned) ; lines|from Dortmund-Lüttgendortmund and to Unna}}
ABZgr~~ ~~ ~~S-Bahn line to Witten 
ABZg+r~~ ~~ ~~
BST~~169.3~~Schnettkerbrücke junction
BHF~~170.1~~Dortmund Signal-Iduna-Park*
ABZgr~~ ~~ ~~Connecting line to Rhenish line
eKRZo~~ ~~ ~~Former Rhenish line
eKRZu~~ ~~ ~~Former  Elias Railway
eABZg+r~~ ~~ ~~Formerly from Elias Railway
BHF~~173.0~~Dortmund-Hörde
ABZgr~~ ~~ ~~Ardey Railway to Iserlohn
BHF~~177.0~~Dortmund-Aplerbeck
HST~~179.6~~Dortmund-Sölde
ABZg+r~~ ~~ ~~Line from Hagen
BHF~~182.0~~Holzwickede
ABZg+l~~ ~~ ~~S-Bahn line from Unna-Königsborn 
S+BHF~~188.9~~Unna
ABZgr~~ ~~ ~~Line to Fröndenberg
ABZgl~~ ~~ ~~Line to Hamm
HST~~193.7~~Lünern
HST~~196.9~~Hemmerde
BHF~~204.6~~Werl
HST~~207.9~~Westönnen
eHST~~210.9~~Ostönnen
ABZg+l~~ ~~ ~~Line from Hamm
BHF~~218.4~~Soest
STR~~ ~~ ~~Line to Warburg
}}
}}

The Dortmund–Soest railway is a line in the German state of North Rhine-Westphalia. It runs from Dortmund Hauptbahnhof through the southern Dortmund district of Holzwickede to Unna and from there through the Hellweg Börde parallel to the Haarstrang ridge on the southern edge of the Westphalian Lowland via Werl to Soest. As the line was opened in 1855, it is one of the oldest railways in Germany.

This electrified route is entirely double track and is classified as a main line. It is served for its full length by the Regionalbahn RB 59 Hellwegbahn service of the Hellweg Network.

History 
After an initial proposal to build a railway from Dortmund to Soest was approved in 1850, on 3 June 1852, the Prussian king, Frederick William IV issued a cabinet order authorising the construction of the line from Dortmund-Hörde to Soest. Construction began on 15 September 1853 in Werl. After a first test run on 7 June 1855, the Bergisch-Märkische Railway Company operated the first scheduled train from Dortmund to Soest on 9 July 1855. The line was double tracked in 1866 and electrified by the end of 1970.

Operations 

Regionalbahn RB 59 Hellweg-Bahn services run on the route Dortmund–Soest line, every half hour from Monday to Friday and every hour on Saturdays and Sundays.

The Hellweg-Bahn has been operated by the Eurobahn company since 14 December 2008, after winning the contract.

The line's finances and tariffs are managed by the Verkehrsverbund Rhein-Ruhr (Rhine-Ruhr Transport Association, VRR) and the Verkehrsgemeinschaft Ruhr-Lippe (Ruhr-Lippe Transport Community'', VRL).

References

Further reading

 

Railway lines in North Rhine-Westphalia
Railway lines opened in 1855
1855 establishments in Prussia
1855 establishments in Germany
Transport in Dortmund